Chithra Madhavan is an Indian historian. Her area of study and expertise is Indian temple history, architecture, sculpture and iconography. She is the author of eight books on these subjects. She is a guest lecturer at many universities in India. She is the author of the "Temple Talk" column in the Indian express newspaper.

Books 
 History and Culture of Tamil Nadu: As Gleaned from the Sanskrit Inscriptions, published by D.K. Print World Ltd, 2005
 Sanskrit Education and Literature: in Ancient and Medieval Tamil Nadu, published by D.K. Print World Ltd, 2013

References

External links
 Talk on evolution of Indian temples

21st-century Indian historians
21st-century Indian women writers
21st-century Indian writers
Living people
Year of birth missing (living people)